DWYD (102.9 FM), broadcasting as 102.9 Brigada News FM, is a radio station owned and operated by Brigada Mass Media Corporation. The station is located at the Kenboy Bldg., Central Plaza Complex, Brgy. Lag-on, Daet.

It was formerly known as Bay Radio from the 1994 until 2010, when Baycomms was acquired by Brigada. Since its inception as Brigada News FM on September 18, 2014, the station already captures wide radio listeners in the whole province of Camarines Norte. Despite its infancy in the news format, BNFM Daet gathers 24.11% audience shares based on the latest Nielsen Philippines survey versus its FM competitors.

References

Radio stations established in 1994
Radio stations in Camarines Norte